Jahana Hayes (née Flemming: born March 8, 1973) is an American educator and politician serving as the U.S. representative for  since 2019. The district, once represented by U.S. Senator Chris Murphy, comprises much of the state's northwestern portion, including New Britain, Danbury, and Waterbury. A member of the Democratic Party, Hayes is the first Black woman and Black Democrat to represent Connecticut in Congress. She was recognized as the National Teacher of the Year in 2016.

Early life and education
Hayes was born on March 8, 1973, in Waterbury, Connecticut, and grew up in public housing projects in that city. She earned an associate degree at Naugatuck Valley Community College and a bachelor's degree at Southern Connecticut State University. In 2012, Hayes earned a master's degree in curriculum and instruction at the University of Saint Joseph. In 2014, she earned her Sixth-Year Certificate from the University of Bridgeport School of Education.

Teaching career
Hayes's first job was at the Southbury Training School in Connecticut. She went on to teach government and history at John F. Kennedy High School in Waterbury. She also chaired the Kennedy SOAR Review Board, a "school within a school" that provided advanced instruction for gifted students, and was a co-adviser of HOPE, a student-service club at Kennedy. In 2015, she was John F. Kennedy Teacher of the Year and then the Waterbury School District Educator of the Year. In 2016 she was named National Teacher of the Year.

This award won Hayes widespread media attention. "I really think that we need to change the narrative, change the dialogue about what teaching is as a profession," Hayes told The Washington Post. "We've spent a lot of time in the last few years talking about the things that are not working. We really need to shift our attention to all the things that are working." Appearing on Ellen DeGeneres's talk show, Hayes said she taught her students "kindness" and "community service." After receiving the award, she addressed the annual meeting of the National Education Association. "I am so grateful to be a member of the NEA," she said, praising it for preventing the "altruistic character trait that all teachers possess" from being exploited.

U.S. House of Representatives

Elections

2018 

In 2018, Hayes ran for the Democratic nomination for Connecticut's 5th congressional district. Her difficult upbringing was a cornerstone of her campaign. “I know what it’s like to go to bed to gunshots outside,” she told an audience at a candidate forum. “I know what it’s like to wake up in the morning to a dead body in the hallway."

Hayes won the primary on August 14, beating Simsbury First Selectman Mary Glassman, who was endorsed by the Connecticut Democratic Party, 62% to 38%. In the November general election, she faced Republican Manny Santos, a former mayor of Meriden.

Hayes supports public education and teachers' unions, and has credited her "union brothers and sisters" with playing a role in her success. In the 2018 election, she was endorsed by the Connecticut Education Association. Her candidacy was also supported by the Connecticut Working Families Party (CTWFP), with CTWFP state director Lindsay Farrell saying that her primary victory "demonstrates the value in electing and mobilizing teachers who will fight for public education, stand up to [Education Secretary] Betsy DeVos, and advocate the importance of collective bargaining."

On November 6, Hayes declared victory, becoming the first black Democratic House member from Connecticut. She and Ayanna Pressley of Massachusetts's 7th congressional district are the first women of color to be elected to Congress from New England.

2020

Hayes was reelected, defeating Republican nominee David X. Sullivan with 55.1% of the vote.

In 2022, Hayes was questioned about the ethics of hiring two of her children to work and receive a salary as campaign staffers.

2022

Hayes ran for reelection in 2022. She narrowly defeated Republican nominee George Logan in the general election.

Committee assignments 
 Committee on Agriculture
 Subcommittee on Livestock and Foreign Agriculture
 Subcommittee on Nutrition, Oversight, and Department Operations
Committee on Education and Labor
Subcommittee on Civil Rights and Human Services
Subcommittee on Early Childhood, Elementary and Secondary Education

Caucus memberships 

 Congressional Black Caucus
 House Pro-Choice Caucus

Political positions
Hayes voted for both the first and second impeachment of Donald Trump.

Soon after winning a second term, Hayes circulated a letter to the Republican House leadership urging it not to place Representative Marjorie Taylor Greene on the House Education Committee, citing Greene's claims that the Sandy Hook Elementary School shooting and other mass school shootings were false flag operations. Sandy Hook is in Hayes's district.

In 2020, Hayes was reported to be on the shortlist for Secretary of Education in the Biden Administration, but Connecticut State Commissioner of Education Miguel Cardona was selected.

As of June 2022, Hayes had voted in line with President Joe Biden's stated position 98.2% of the time.

Syria
In 2023, Hayes voted against H.Con.Res. 21 which directed President Joe Biden to remove U.S. troops from Syria within 180 days.

Personal life

Hayes lives in Wolcott, north of Waterbury, with her husband and four children.

Electoral history

See also
List of African-American United States representatives
Women in the United States House of Representatives

References

External links

 Congresswoman Jahana Hayes official U.S. House website
 Jahana Hayes for U.S. Congress campaign website

|-

1973 births
African-American members of the United States House of Representatives
African-American people in Connecticut politics
African-American schoolteachers
Schoolteachers from Connecticut
African-American women in politics
Democratic Party members of the United States House of Representatives from Connecticut
Female members of the United States House of Representatives
Living people
People from Wolcott, Connecticut
Politicians from Waterbury, Connecticut
Southern Connecticut State University alumni
University of Bridgeport alumni
University of Saint Joseph (Connecticut) alumni
Women in Connecticut politics
21st-century American educators
21st-century American women politicians
21st-century American politicians
21st-century American women educators
21st-century African-American women
21st-century African-American politicians
20th-century African-American people
20th-century African-American women